Gabriel Núñez Aguirre (6 February 1942 – 11 November 2021) was a Mexican football defender who played for Mexico national team in the 1966 FIFA World Cup. He also played for Atlético Zacatepec.

Núñez died from cancer on 11 November 2021, at the age of 79. His cousin is María Rebollo Aguirre, the cook.

References

External links
FIFA profile

1942 births
2021 deaths
Mexican footballers
Mexico international footballers
Association football defenders
1966 FIFA World Cup players
Club Atlético Zacatepec players
Club América footballers
Liga MX players
People from Taxco